Holosteum umbellatum, the jagged chickweed, is a species of flowering plant in the family Caryophyllaceae. It is native to Europe but has also been introduced to North America.

References

Caryophyllaceae
Flora of Europe
Plants described in 1753
Taxa named by Carl Linnaeus